Ride the Man Down is a 1952 American Western film directed by Joseph Kane, written by Mary C. McCall, Jr., and starring Brian Donlevy, Rod Cameron, Ella Raines, Forrest Tucker, Barbara Britton, Chill Wills and J. Carrol Naish. The film was released on November 25, 1952, by Republic Pictures.

Plot
Celia Evarts and her uncle John inherit the valuable Hatchet Ranch after their father dies in a blizzard. Other cattlemen and cowboys in the region immediately try to take advantage, grazing on the land and using its water for free. Celia's uncle is also shot and killed.

Will Ballard, her foreman, sets out to protect Celia's interests, with sheriff Joe Kneen's help, particularly after Celia's fiance, Sam Danfelser, betrays her and sides with Bide Marriner, a rich rancher who hopes to gain control of Hatchet for himself. Bide seizes a watering hole and the only way Will can think of to defeat him is to destroy it. Bide then tries to shoot the sheriff in the back, but Kneen gets the better of him. Sam rides in for one more confrontation, but before he and Will can come face to face, Celia slips away and takes care of matters herself.

Cast 
   	 
Brian Donlevy as Bide Marriner
Rod Cameron as Will Ballard
Ella Raines as Celia Evarts
Forrest Tucker as Sam Danfelser
Barbara Britton as Lottie Priest
Chill Wills as Ike Adams
J. Carrol Naish as Sheriff Joe Kneen
Jim Davis as Red Courteen
Taylor Holmes as Lowell Priest
James Bell as John Evarts
Paul Fix as Ray Cavanaugh
Al Caudebec as Mel Young
Roydon Clark as Jim Young
Roy Barcroft as Russ Schultz
Douglas Kennedy as Harve Garrison
Chris-Pin Martin as Chris
Jack La Rue as Kennedy
Claire Carleton as Amelia

Production
Parts of the film were shot in Kanab Canyon, Johnson Canyon, and Cave Lakes in Utah.

References

External links 
 

1952 films
American Western (genre) films
1952 Western (genre) films
Republic Pictures films
Films directed by Joseph Kane
Films shot in Utah
Trucolor films
1950s English-language films
1950s American films